Events in the year 2005 in China.

Incumbents 
 Party General Secretary – Hu Jintao
 President – Hu Jintao
 Premier – Wen Jiabao
 Vice President – Zeng Qinghong
 Vice Premier – Huang Ju
 Congress Chairman – Wu Bangguo
 Conference Chairman – Jia Qinglin

Governors  
 Governor of Anhui Province – Wang Jinshan
 Governor of Fujian Province – Huang Xiaojing 
 Governor of Guangdong Province – Lu Hao
 Governor of Guizhou Province – Huang Huahua
 Governor of Hainan Province – Shi Xiushi
 Governor of Hebei Province – Wei Liucheng
 Governor of Henan Province – Ji Yunshi
 Governor of Hunan Province – Zhou Bohua 
 Governor of Jiangsu Province – Li Chengyu
 Governor of Jiangxi Province – Liang Baohua
 Governor of Jilin Province – Wang Min
 Governor of Liaoning Province – Zhang Wenyue
 Governor of Qinghai Province – Song Xiuyan
 Governor of Shaanxi Province – Chen Deming
 Governor of Shandong Province – Han Yuqun
 Governor of Shanxi Province – Song Xiuyan
 Governor of Sichuan Province – Zhang Baoshun (until July), Yu Youjun (starting July)
 Governor of Yunnan Province: Xu Rongkai
 Governor of Zhejiang Province – Lü Zushan

Events

March
 Protests in Huashui: environmental protests ran through March and April
 March 14 – Anti-Secession Law: The People's Republic of China ratifies an anti-secession law, aimed at preventing Taiwan from declaring independence even though it had been independent since 1949.

April
 April 11 – Anti-Japanese demonstrations in China: 20,000 protesters marching in two cities in southern Guangdong province objecting to a recently amended Japanese schoolbook which allegedly glosses over Japan's imperialist past.
 April 18 – 2005 anti-Japanese demonstrations: Sino-Japanese relations worsen after a meeting between Chinese State Councilor Tang Jiaxuan, Foreign Minister Li Zhaoxing, and Japanese Foreign Minister Nobutaka Machimura in Beijing. China continues to refuse an apology for the increasing number of anti-Japanese protests, and further accuses Japan for handling the issues of history and Taiwan "incorrectly".

August
 August 18 – Peace Mission 2005, the first joint China–Russia military exercise, begins its 8-day training on the Shandong peninsula.

October
 October 12 – The second Chinese spacecraft, Shenzhou 6, is launched, carrying Fei Junlong and Nie Haisheng for 5 days in orbit.
 October 15 - Qinghai-Tibet Railway is completed in China

November
 November 13 – Jilin chemical plant explosions 2005: a series of explosions occurred in a chemical Plant in Jilin City. The explosions killed six, injured dozens, and caused the evacuation of tens of thousands of residents. During the incident a large discharge of nitrobenzene went into the Songhua River. Levels of the carcinogen were so high that the entire water supply to Harbin city (pop 3.8M) was cut off for five days between November 21, 2005 and November 26, 2005.
 November 26 - SM City Jinjiang, the second SM Mall in the Chinese Mainland was opened.

Full date unknown
Broad & Bright law firm is founded.

Deaths
 January 17 – Zhao Ziyang, former Chinese premier and General Secretary of the Chinese Communist Party (born 1919)
 April 24 – Fei Xiaotong, a pioneering Chinese researcher and professor of sociology and anthropology (born 1910)
 July 2 – Gu Yue, Chinese actor (born 1937)
 July 6 – Huang Kun, a well-known Chinese physicist (born 1919)
 August 7 – Li Lili, Chinese film actress (born 1915)
 August 18 – Gao Xiumin, well-known Chinese comedy actress (born 1959)
 August 30 – Fu Biao, famous Chinese actor (born 1963)
 October 17 – Ba Jin, Chinese writer (born 1904)
 October 26 – Rong Yiren, the Vice-President of the People's Republic of China from 1993 to 1998 (born 1916)
 December 23 – Yao Wenyuan, Chinese politician (born 1931)

See also
 List of Chinese films of 2005
 Chinese Super League 2005
 Hong Kong League Cup 2005–gikuzhgözufh06

References 

 
Years of the 21st century in China